George Augustus Middleton (1791–1848) was an English-Australian pastor and farmer who spent his time in Australia between Parramatta and the Hunter Valley.

Early life 
George Middleton was born on 31 August 1791 in London. He was educated at the Westminster School. He studied at St John's College at Cambridge University. He attended there on scholarship as bishop boy where he studied classics, but failed to graduate. 

He worked a private tutor at Holland House in London. He returned to Westminster School as a teacher. He became a bishop of London on 18 July 1818. He was appointed ordained priest for the colonies in 1819.

Time in Sydney 
He arrived in Port Jackson on 27 January 1820 with his son George. In August 1819 he was commissioned as an assistant chaplain for New South Wales. He was twenty nine years old. He worked an assistant chaplain and was directed to work as locum. While in Parramatte he worked as a school examiner and worked in Sunday schools. He made most of his income by performing marriage ceremonies.

In 1831 he decided to move his family Sydney due to drought and moved his family to Waterview House, one of the first houses in Balmain. In 1832 he established a school.

Time in Hunter Valley 
By December was appointed to go to Newcastle. He was the first chaplain to serve north of the Hawkesbury River. In March 1821 he was appointed the Assistant Chaplain of Newcastle. While serving in Newcastle he created the vestry of Christ Church .He travelled along the Paterson and Williams River , Patrick's Plain and Segenhoe in order to visit free settlers. In 1825 he visited Lake Macquarie. In 1826 he voiced outrage on how Archdeacon Thomas Scott was treating convicts. In May 1827 he resigned when Scott tried to transfer him to Port Macquarie. He moved to Moore Park near Hinton where he set up a travelling ministry separate from the Anglican Church. From 1828 to 1830 he travelled around Morpeth, Maitland, Branxton and Paterson to visiting patrons and performing baptisms. In 1837 Bishop William Grant Broughton granted Middleton a license to perform marriage ceremonies at his house as no churches existed in the area. He conducted business at Bishop Broughton's home in Phoenix Park. In 1845 he became the chaplain of St Paul's Church, Paterson when it opened. He ran a school in Morpeth while working with the Butterwick parish. He roles as priest was to prepare children for confirmation, perform marriage ceremonies, baptisms and funerals including occasional ones outside his parish.

In 1821 he selected 400 acres of land on the Patersons Plains upstream from the government settlement. By the end of 1822 he had cleared 14 acres and grew 9 acres of wheat and owned 3 horses, 54 cattle and 52 pigs. In 1826 was invited to surrender his land at Patersons Plains to the church and school corporation in return for compensation. In 1827 he agreed and received his compensation. In 1828 he was granted 2,000 acres of Crown Land at Patersons Plains adjoining James Webber's land which he named Glenrose. On 8 May 1829 he received a grazing licence for 1,000 acres of land. On 19 April 1829 Sir George Gipps granted Middleton 2,000 acres of land. Later he was forced to give a quarter acre of land to build a cemetery. 

Middleton did some work with the Awabakal people of Newcastle. He helped Reverend Lancelot Threlkeld establish a mission for Indigenous people in Belmont. On 29 July he baptised an Aboriginal man from the New England district.

Middleton had convicts on his property and did limited work around convicts. He only interacted to convicts assigned to his property or worked on road gangs. He only performed his ministry work on free settlers.

Personal life 
On 17 March 1817 he married his first wife Mary Hull who died before he came to Australia. He joined a vogue with John Blaxland Junior where they discovered an overland route to Newcastle. On 12 February 1824 in Liverpool he married his second wife Sarah. He had fifteen children with his second wife. He died on 15 May 1848 at Hinton. No death certificate was ever produced and the cause of death remains unknown.His funeral took place on 18 May 1848 at St James Church, Morpeth. Middleton and his second wife Sarah are buried together in Morpeth cemetery.

In 1779 he was awarded the silver medal of royal academy of arts in London for the best drawing of the tower and spire of St. Mary-le-Bow Church, London. In 1788 he was appointed to make repairs on the church. 

He became a member of the Agricultural Society of New South Wales, the Agricultural Society and the Paterson Farmers' Club. He was also involved in the Benevolent Society where he became a regular donor and the treasurer of the committee. He also served as a Justice of the peace.

References

1791 births
1848 deaths
Australian Anglican priests